Neemera is a village of geographical importance in Sikar district of Rajasthan, India. It is located at a distance of 27 km from Sikar town in south. 

According to the 2011 census it has a population of 96 living in 195 households.

There is an ancient Temple dedicated to Laxmi Narayan (God of Power). The sacred shrine of Jeenmata is near the village and is located at a distance of 2.7 km from Nimera it is believed to be a thousand years old. Millions of devotees assemble here for a colourful festival held twice in a year in the month of Chaitra and Ashvin during the Navratri.
There are a number of dharamshalas to accommodate large number of visitors.
Nimera is situated near the hill 9 km from village Rewasa. It is surrounded by thick forest.
The village was a place of travels from early times and was repaired and rebuilt several times. There is a popular Lake salusagar belief which has come down to people through the centuries that in a village
Nimera is the village of Kumawat (Kumhar sub-caste) and Gurjars.

The other famous thing is of Neemera is Jeenmata's tunnel it is believed that goddess came from harsh to Jeenmat by the help of this tunnel.

See also
 List of lakes in India

References

Villages in Sikar district